Eagles Nest is an unincorporated community located in Coahoma County, Mississippi, United States. Eagles Nest is named for the former plantation of James L. Alcorn, which in turn received its name from an eagle's nest that was built near the site. The community is located on the former Louisville, New Orleans and Texas Railway. A post office operated under the name Eagles Nest from 1887 to 1909.

Notable person
James L. Alcorn, governor of Mississippi from 1870 to 1871. Alcorn is buried near the site of his former home in Eagles Nest.

References

Unincorporated communities in Coahoma County, Mississippi
Unincorporated communities in Mississippi